The 1902 European Rowing Championships were rowing championships held on the Rhine on a day in the latter part of August. Generally referred to as being held in Strasbourg, the International Rowing Federation website implies that the championships were based in Kehl on the opposite side of the Rhine to Strasbourg. Either way, both towns were at the time part of the German Empire. The competition was for men only and they competed in five boat classes (M1x, M2x, M2+, M4+, M8+).

Medal summary

Footnotes

References

European Rowing Championships
European Rowing Championships
Rowing
Rowing
European Rowing Championships
Rowing